Paul Lucas may refer to:

 Paul Lucas (footballer) (1936–1992), English football (soccer) player
 Paul Lucas (genealogist) (1683–1759), French genealogist and Augustinian friar, known as Père Simplicien or Simplicien Lucas
 Paul Lucas (playwright), American playwright
 Paul Lucas (politician) (born 1962), Deputy Premier and Minister for Health, in the Government of Queensland
 Paul Lucas (traveller) (1664–1737), French merchant, naturalist and traveller

See also
 Paul Lukas (1895–1971), Hungarian actor
 Paul Lukas (journalist), American sports writer
 Pál Lukács (1919–1981), Hungarian musician